The Heinkel HD 39 was a special-purpose cargo aircraft developed in Germany in the 1920s to distribute the Berlin newspaper B.Z.. It was a conventional single-bay biplane with staggered wings of equal span, and a fuselage that nearly filled the interplane gap. The pilot sat in an open cockpit, and the undercarriage was of fixed, tailskid type with divided main units. The sole example of the type was built after Ernst Heinkel found out, by chance, that B.Z. required such an aircraft and had ordered two machines from Albatros. Heinkel convinced publisher Ullstein-Verlag to purchase a third aircraft from his firm.

The design was based on the HD 27 mail plane, and had a specially-designed payload bay to carry newspapers in 50 kg (110 lb) bundles. 10 separate compartments in the bay could be individually opened in flight in order to air-drop newspapers in places where the HD 39 could not land.

The HD 39 entered service alongside two Albatros L 72s in April 1926 and remained in Service until 1931, when distribution of B.Z. by air was taken over by Deutsche Luft Hansa.

Specifications

References

Further reading

External links
 

1920s German cargo aircraft
HD 39
Biplanes
Aircraft first flown in 1926